Bloomington High School is a high school in unincorporated Bloomington, California, near Riverside, Rialto, San Bernardino, and Fontana.

History
The school was established in 1962 for a student population of 900. As of 2006, the number of students was around 3000. It belongs to the Colton Joint Unified School District. The school mascot is a Bruin which is a type of young bear. A new football field was purchased in 2003–04. The school has put in new Math and Science wings and has been open since 10 October 2011.

Notable alumni 
 Charlyne Yi, actor.
 Charles Lewis, Jr. aka Mask, founder TapouT clothing company, & UFC Hall of Famer.

Sports

CIF Southern Section championships
 Football: 1994 CIF Southern Section, Division VIII Champions.
 Football: 1996 CIF Southern Section, Division VII Champions.
 Football: 1997 CIF Southern Section, Division VII Champions.
 Football: 1998 CIF Southern Section, Division VIII Champions.
 Football: 1999 CIF Southern Section, Division VIII Champions.
 Wrestling: 2010 CIF Southern Section, Division 6 Dual-Meet Champions.
 Wrestling: 2011 CIF Southern Section, Division 5 Dual-Meet Champions.
 Wrestling: 2012 CIF Southern Section, Division 5 Dual-Meet Champions.
 Wrestling: 2013 CIF Southern Section, Division 4 Dual-Meet Champions.
 Wrestling: 2014 CIF Southern Section, Division 4 Dual-Meet Champions.
 Girls Soccer: 2020 CIF Southern Section, Division 6 Champions.

CIF Souther Section Runner up
 Baseball: 1970 CIF Southern Section, 2-A Championship Runner Up.
 Baseball: 1975 CIF Southern Section, 2-A Championship Runner Up.
 Cross-Country: 1977 CIF Southern Section, 1-A Championship Runner Up.
 Baseball: 1978 CIF Southern Section, 2-A Championship Runner Up.
 Softball: 1999 CIF Southern Section, Division IV Championship Runner Up.
 Wrestling: 2015 CIF Southern Section, Central Division Dual-Meet Championship Runners Up.
 Girls Soccer: 2016 CIF Southern Section, Division 6 Championship Runner Up.

National Rankings
 #19 All-time Football Season Score: 1994 - 880 Points
 Tied-#3 All-time One Half Football Score: 1994 - 84 Points
 #9 All-time Football Score Per Game: 1994 - 62.9 Points/Game
 #13 All-time Football Rushing Yards per Season: 1996 - 5,813 Yards
 #15 All-time Football Rushing Yards per Season: 1994 - 5,622 Yards
 #16 All-time Football Rushing Yards per Season: 1998 - 5,555 Yards

California State Scoring Record
 Football Scoring Record: 1994-2014 - 880 Points
 Football One Half Scoring Record: 1994 - 84 Points
 Football Score Per Game: 1994 - 62.9 Points/Game

CIF Southern Section Records
 Football Scoring Record: 1994 - 880 Points
 Football Most Points in a Half Record: 1995 - 84 Points
 Football Most Rushing Yards in a Season Record: 1996 - 5,813 yards

CIF Southern Section Top 10
 Football Most Points in a Season: 1997 - 774 Points
 Football Most Points in a Season: 1996 - 724 Points
 Football Most Points in a Game: 1994 - 144 Points
 Football Most Rushing Yards in a Season: 1994 - 5,622 yards 
 Football Most Rushing Yards in a Season: 1998 - 5,555 yards
 Football Most Rushing Yards in a Game: 1996 - 675 yards

References

External links
School website 

High schools in San Bernardino County, California
Public high schools in California
1962 establishments in California